Hydnellum coalitum is a tooth fungus in the family Bankeraceae. Found in Europe, it was described as new to science in 1975 by Dutch mycologist Rudolph Arnold Maas Geesteranus, from collections made in France.

References

External links

Fungi described in 1975
Fungi of Europe
Inedible fungi
coalitum